Bras Basah Single Member Constituency was a constituency in Singapore. It existed from 1959 to 1976. It was represented in the Parliament of Singapore by Hoe Puay Choo from 1959 to 1963 then by Ho See Beng from 1963 to 1976.

In 1976, the constituency was absorbed into Khe Bong Single Member Constituency, which is located at Toa Payoh. 4,301 voters has been moved out of Bras Basah into Toa Payoh. The remaining residents who continue to stay at Bras Basah will be split. 2,456 voters will go to Telok Ayer whereas 3,921 voters will go to Kampong Glam.

Member of Parliament

Elections

Elections in 1950s

Elections in 1960s

Elections in 1970s

References

Singaporean electoral divisions